George (Poddy) Aiston (1879–1943) was an Australian ethnographer and outback pioneer who spent much of his life as policeman in the South Australian town of Mulka on the Birdsville Track.

External sources

 Aiston to W. H. Gill, correspondence, 1920–40 (State Library of New South Wales)
 Savage, Life in Central Australia ; compiled by George Aiston and George Horne, edited and published by David M. Welsh, London, Macmillan, 1924.
 The Aboriginal narcotic pitcheri George Aiston. Sydney, Australian National Research Council, 1930
 The Mulka Store ruins is listed on the South Australian state register of heritage places.

References

Amateur anthropologists
Australian anthropologists
1879 births
1943 deaths
Settlers of South Australia
Australian police officers
Far North (South Australia)
People from Adelaide